Billy Jackson (born 15 October 1999) is a British professional boxer.

As of October 2022, Jackson is ranked 350 in the world and 38 In the UK with a massive leap in the rankings after his latest win.

Early life 

Billy Jackson was born on 15 October 1999 in Maidstone. At the age of 2, Jackson was trained by his father in various Martial Arts, and by the age of 6, he joined classes in kickboxing and boxing. Jackson joined various clubs to gain experience from sparring as he continued to be coached by his father. Jackson went on to win area, English and British titles as a kickboxer sanctioned by the WKA and also boxed as an amateur boxer, only losing 2 of his amateur bouts in a Youth National Final and one in a England select team v Cayman Islands. Jackson also boxed in less regulated prize fighting, unlicensed boxing, mainly for money at the early age of 14, having to box much older opponents. Jackson had 27 unlicensed boxing fights winning English and British tiles on various promotions like UKBC. Jackson has one of the quickest knock outs aged only 16 of a much older opponent on Lee Eaton’s EBA in under 16 seconds of the first round. In Jacksons 27 unlicensed fights he lost twice giving away age, experience and in some cases 20Kg in small used non commissioned gloves, the only time he lost he was only 17 fighting men in their 30’s  Jackson has been a advocate for young boxers to remain in the amateurs where there is more control on age, weight, head guards, medicals and glove size. Jackson won 24 out of 27 unlicensed fights. Losing two and drawing one.

Amateur career 
Jackson lost only two bouts as an amateur in a youth national final and a select team v Cayman islands.
Jackson won gold at the famous Hvidorve Box Cup in Denmark.

Professional career 

Jackson made his professional debut on 17 November 2018, his style always suited the professional ranks and saw him winning a four round points decision over Dylan Draper at the Brentwood Centre in Brentwood, Jackson put Drapper down in the first round.

In November 2018, Jackson signed a two fight deal contract with MTK.

On 14 December 2018,Jackson fought Lee Hallett On box nation live on television beating Hallett with ease.

Jacksons next fight came on 8 May 2019 against  MJ Hall at the York Hall beating Hall with ease.

Jackson was out of the ring for 3 years due to lock down, and it is well known he took that time under his father guidance to spar at Matchroom Elite Gym with the likes of Joe Cordina, Conor  Benn, Felix Cash, Ted Cheeseman, Jackson also sparred regular at McGuigans gym sparring Anthony Fowler & Robbie Davis jnr. Other sparring opponents include Chris Kongo, Samual Antwi, Sam Giley & Jordon Dujon this quality of sparring and changes made in training has put Jackson in contention for titles in 2023.

On the 9th July 2022 Jackson won his 4th Professional fight at the Lee Valley Athletic Centre.

Billy Jackson is now recognised as Bromley’s  hot prospect and is currently trained by his father who is a renowned boxing coach.

After being the sparring partner for 3 camps to Conor Benn in 2021 & 2022 Jackson was offered a fight on Matchroom DAZN in 2023.

In Jacksons 5th professional fight he fought another undefeated boxer Gideon Onyenani (Jonas) on the 1st October 2022 at the York Hall over 8 rounds. Jackson is now 5-0, beating Jonus with ease winning 7 of the 8 rounds on a Neilson Boxing promotion. Jackson was close to stopping Jonas in the 7th round. Jackson was co-main event. This was a step up for Jackson from the normal 4 rounders to a big step up in class to 8 rounds. Both fighters were 4-0 going into this fight. Jackson was able to show his improvements and outclass Jonas. Jackson v Jonas was chief support for Area title.

Professional boxing record

References 

10. https://www.instagram.com/billythekidboxer/

11.https://mobile.twitter.com/Billythekid_23j

External links 

 https://www.instagram.com/billythekidboxer/
 https://mobile.twitter.com/Billythekid_23j

1999 births
Living people
English male boxers
People from Maidstone